An antiplatyhelmintic agent is a type of anthelmintic designed to reduce flatworm infection.

References

Anthelmintics
Platyhelminth biology